A by-election was held for the New South Wales Legislative Assembly electorate of Morpeth on 7 August 1860 because Edward Close resigned. Close later stated that he resigned because it had been a lengthy session of parliament, marked by a contest for power between Charles Cowper, William Forster and John Robertson in which nothing was done.

Dates

Polling places

Result

Edward Close resigned.

See also
Electoral results for the district of Morpeth
List of New South Wales state by-elections

References

1860 elections in Australia
New South Wales state by-elections
1860s in New South Wales